Denk bloß nicht, ich heule is a 1965 East German drama film directed by Frank Vogel of DEFA Studio. Until 27 April 1990 the film was banned in East Germany because of its social criticism. The film was said to have "problematized the oppression of critical young people in East German schools."

Cast
 Peter Reusse as Peter Neumann
 Anne-Kathrein Kretzschmar as Anne
 Hans Hardt-Hardtloff as Anne's Father
 Jutta Hoffmann as Uschi
 Helga Göring as Frau Naumann
 Harry Hindemith as Herr Naumann
 Herbert Köfer as Herr Röhle
 Fred Delmare as Brigadier
 Arno Wyzniewski as Dieter
 Horst Buder as Ami
 Hans H. Marin as Langer
 Heinz-Dieter Obiora as Valente
 Armin Mechsner as Jonny
 Alexander Lang as Latte
 Hans-Peter Körner as Klaus
 Uwe Karpa as Bubi
 Werner Dissel as Mantek
 Gerhard Klein as Ober
 Carmen-Maja Antoni as Student with glasses

References

External links
 

1965 films
1960s coming-of-age drama films
East German films
German coming-of-age drama films
1965 drama films
1960s German films
1960s German-language films